Anne Cobham may refer to:

 Anne Brooke, Baroness Cobham, born Anne Braye
 Anne Burgh, Baroness Cobham of Sterborough in her own right, born Anne Cobham, Baroness Cobham